Bolger may refer to:

People
Andrew Keenan-Bolger (born 1985), American actor
Barnaby Bolger, Anglican priest
Ben Bolger (born 1989), English rugby league footballer
Benjamin Bolger (born 1975), second most credentialed person in modern history
Bill Bolger (1931–2009), American basketball player
Billy Bolger (1910–1977), Australian golfer
Cian Bolger (born 1992), Irish footballer
Celia Keenan-Bolger (born 1978), American actress and singer
Daniel P. Bolger (born 1957), U.S. Army Lieutenant General and author
David Bolger (born 1968), Irish choreographer
Deirdre Bolger (born 1938), Irish politician
Dermot Bolger (born 1959), Irish novelist, playwright and poet
Emma Bolger (born 1996), Irish actress
Jase Bolger (born 1971), American politician
Jim Bolger (born 1935), former Prime Minister of New Zealand
Jim Bolger (baseball) (1932–2020), American baseball outfielder
Jim Bolger (racehorse trainer) (born 1941), Irish racehorse trainer
Joel Bolger (born 1955), American lawyer
John A. Bolger, Jr. (1908–1990), American sound engineer
John Michael Bolger (born 1957), American actor
Jordan Bolger (born 1994), Afro-British actor
Kevin Bolger (born 1993), American cross-country skier
Laurie Bolger (born 1989), English poet, stand-up and presenter
Maggie Keenan-Bolger (born 1983), American actress
Marguerite Bolger, Irish judge
Martin Bolger (1906–1991), Australian rules footballer
Merv Bolger (1919-1993), Australian rules footballer
Nicola Bolger (born 1993), Australian football player
Patrick Bolger (born 1948), Canadian former wrestler
Phil Bolger (1927–2009), American naval architect
Ray Bolger (1904–1987), American entertainer
Robert J. Bolger (1922-2007), American businessman
Sarah Bolger (born 1991), Irish actress
Thomas Bolger (Irish politician) (1856–1938), Irish politician
Thomas A. Bolger (1887–1953), American politician
Thomas Bolger (wrestler) (1904–1995), Australian wrestler
William F. Bolger (1923–1989), 65th Postmaster General of the United States

Fictional characters
James Bolger, character in 11/11/11

Places
Bolger, Ontario

See also
Bulger (disambiguation)